Finger Hill is the highest peak on the island of Peng Chau in Hong Kong, with a height of  above sea level.

Access
There is a family trail leading up to the summit. This is a gentle walk and can be done year-round.

References

See also
 List of mountains, peaks and hills in Hong Kong
 Peng Chau

Peng Chau
Mountains, peaks and hills of Hong Kong